The German wind farm developer Plambeck Neue Energien founded a Bulgarian joint venture in 2008. This joint venture actually develops several wind farm projects. The medium-term target is to find wind farm sites with a capacity for wind turbines with a nominal output of together up to 250 MW with a capital investment required of up to US$450 million.

See also

Kavarna Wind Farm
Eolica Varna Wind Farm
Murgash Wind Farm
Stara Planina Wind Farm

References

Proposed wind farms in Bulgaria